Skanstull is an area in Södermalm in Stockholm. Skanstull connects the traffic between the inner city and the south parts of Stockholm and its suburbs. Skanstull was originally the city's southern toll station, but the toll station was removed in 1857. Skanstull served as an execution site in the 17th century. It is the birthplace of Swedish artist Bladee.

The Skanstull metro station was opened in 1950.

References

Geography of Stockholm

fi:Skanstull